Label 5 is a brand of blended Scotch whisky produced by La Martiniquaise in Scotland.

Label 5 is a combination of grain whiskie and malt whiskie that come mostly from the Glen Moray distillery. The biggest part of the output of Glen Moray is used on this brand. The biggest market of Label 5 is France but is been expanded to Western Europe, Australia, Colombia, Mexico and South Africa. Label 5 is the 9th best selling Scotch brand worldwide.

References 

Blended Scotch whisky